Anna Júlia Donáth (born 6 April 1987) is a Hungarian politician. She was elected as a Momentum Movement (part of the Renew Europe group) Member of the European Parliament (MEP) in the 2019 European parliamentary election. Donáth was the leader of the party between 21 November 2021 and 29 May 2022.

Early life and career
Donáth was born on 6 April 1987 in Budapest, Hungary to László Donáth and Ildikó Muntag. She is the youngest of three siblings. Her father László Donáth is a former pastor,   
and a former member of parliament for the Hungarian Socialist Party. Her paternal grandfather, Ferenc Donáth, is of Jewish descent, and was a lawyer and one of the three secretaries of the Central Committee of the Hungarian Socialist Workers' Party during the Hungarian Revolution of 1956.

Donáth's early education was at Veres Péter High School in Békásmegyer, Budapest. She studied sociology at the Eötvös Loránd University in Budapest, and migration and ethnic studies at the University of Amsterdam. After graduating, she completed an internship at the European Commission, before returning to Hungary to become a project manager for the non-governmental organization (NGO), Menedék. She joined Momentum Movement in 2016, and became its vice president in June 2018. Donáth was a candidate for the centrist party in the 2018 Hungarian parliamentary election. The party did not win any seats in the election.

In December 2018, Donáth participated in a protest against the Hungarian government's new labour law dubbed by opponents as the 'slave law' which raised the overtime yearly cap for workers from 250 to 400 hours, and allowed businesses three years instead of one year to pay for the overtime. Donáth was arrested at the protest, and later released.

European Parliament
Donáth stood as a candidate for Momentum Movement in the 2019 European Parliament election. She was second on her party's list, and was elected as one of its two MEPs (the other being Katalin Cseh) in Hungary. She represents the third generation of her family to enter political office (after her father and her paternal grandfather). 

In the European Parliament, Donáth is a member of the Renew Europe party group. She serves on the Committee on Civil Liberties, Justice and Home Affairs. In this capacity, she is also member of the Democracy, Rule of Law & Fundamental Rights Monitoring Group. In 2022, she joined the Committee of Inquiry to investigate the use of Pegasus and equivalent surveillance spyware.  

In addition to her committee assignments, Donáth is part of the parliament's delegation to the EU–Albania Stabilisation and Association Parliamentary Committee, the European Parliament Intergroup on Freedom of Religion or Belief and Religious Tolerance, and the European Parliament Intergroup on LGBT Rights.

After becoming an MEP, Donáth gained immunity from prosecution for her participation in the December 2018 labour law protest, however Donáth chose to waive it on 29 May 2019.

Donáth was elected leader of the Momentum Movement on 21 November 2021. She acquired 56.6 percent of the vote, defeating Anna Orosz (28.9%) and Gábor Hollai (14.5%). Following the 2022 parliamentary election, where the opposition alliance United for Hungary, including Momentum, suffered a heavy defeat, Donáth announced on 9 May 2022 that she was pregnant, and would not stand for the party's renewal election. She was succeeded by Ferenc Gelencsér.

Recognition
In December 2020, Donáth received an award at The Parliament Magazine's annual MEP Awards for best use of Social Media.

References

1987 births
Living people
MEPs for Hungary 2019–2024
Women MEPs for Hungary
21st-century Hungarian politicians
Momentum Movement politicians
Politicians from Budapest